The mountains of Bhutan are some of the most prominent natural geographic features of the kingdom. Weather is extreme in the mountains: the high peaks have perpetual snow, and the lesser mountains and hewn gorges have high winds all year round, making them barren brown wind tunnels in summer, and frozen wastelands in winter. The blizzards generated in the north each winter often drift southward into the central highlands.

The mountains of Bhutan define its three main geographic zones: the Great Himalaya, the Lower Himalayan Range (or Inner Himalaya), and the Sub-Himalayan Range. The northern region consists of an arc of glaciated mountain peaks with an arctic climate at the highest elevations. Watered by snow-fed rivers, alpine valleys in this region provide pasturage for livestock tended by a sparse population of migratory shepherds. These mountains, and especially their western valleys, make up the economic and cultural heart of the kingdom, including most of its dzongs. Many lower mountain ranges are composed of coarse granite sandstone, while rocks at the highest elevations consist of gneiss among upheaved strata of mica and talcose slate. Many ranges are abundant in limestone.

Bhutan's valleys are carved into the Himalaya by its rivers, fed by glacial melt and monsoon rains. Much of the Bhutanese population is concentrated in valleys and lowlands, separated by the rugged southward spurs of the Inner Himalaya.  Despite modernization and development of transport in Bhutan, including a national highway system, travel from one valley to the next remains difficult. Western valleys are bound to the east by the Black Mountains in central Bhutan, which form a watershed between two major river systems, the punatsangchhu (Sankosh River) and the Drangme Chhu. Central valleys are separated from the east by the Donga Range. The more isolated mountain valleys protect several tiny, distinct cultural and linguistic groups.

Bhutan controls several strategic Himalayan mountain passes including routes between Tibet and Assam. These routes, being the only way into the kingdom, along with centuries-old policies of isolationism, have gained Bhutan the nickname "Mountain Fortress of the Gods." Although the British established a protectorate over Bhutan and occupied its lowlands, the mountainous interior has never been successfully invaded.

Great Himalaya

The mountains of Great Himalaya dominate the north of Bhutan, where peaks can easily reach . The tallest peaks range, from west to east, along northern Haa, Paro and Thimphu Districts; the bulk of Gasa District; northernmost Wangdue Phodrang District; and northern Bumthang and Lhuentse Districts. Some massive summits such as Gangkhar Puensum, Kula Kangri, and Tongshanjiabu lie in territory disputed among Bhutan and China. According to Bhutanese claims, these giants should be part of Gasa District. Other peaks of the Great Himalaya, such as Mount Jitchu Drake, lie squarely within Gasa.

The Great Himalaya contains most of the glaciers of Bhutan. This region contains the vast majority of Bhutan's 677 glaciers and 2,674 glacial lakes and subsidiary lakes, out of which 25 pose a risk of GLOFs. The vast number of glaciers in Bhutan are classed as "valley" and "mountain glaciers," although significant numbers of "ice apron," and "niche glacier" types also exist. Some glacial lakes, such as Thorthormi Lake in Lunana Gewog, are not single bodies of water but collections supraglacial ponds.

Lower Himalayan Range

The Lower Himalayan Ranges, also called the Inner Himalaya, are southward spurs of the Great Himalaya, dominating the midsection of Bhutan. The Dongkya Range forms the trijunction of the Bhutan-Sikkim-Tibet border, separating Sikkim from the Chumbi Valley The Black Mountains in central Bhutan form a watershed between two major river systems, the Mo Chhu and the Drangme Chhu. Eastern Bhutan is divided by another southward spur, the Donga Range, whose valleys tend to be steeper ravines.

Unlike the Great Himalaya, there are no glaciers in the Inner Himalayan ranges, though some summits and upper slopes are covered with moraines.

Black Mountains

The Black Mountains, lie to the east of the Sankosh River. Midway between Punakha and Trongsa, they separate western Bhutan from the ethnolinguistically diverse central regions and the densely populated eastern regions. The Black Mountains themselves spur ramifications to the southwest and southeast, reaching into Trongsa District.

The isolation of populations in the Black Mountain area has produced great linguistic and ethnic diversity:  it is the home of the Lakha, Nyenkha, and 'Olekha languages, representing distantly related Tibetan and East Bodish language groups.

Between Trongsa and Jakar runs another mountain range, crossed by Yuto La pass (also called Yotong La).

Donga Range

The steep Donga Range separates Bumthang and Lhuentse Districts and forms the watershed between the Raidāk and Manas River systems. Northeastern portions of the Donga are known as Kurtoe (modern Kurtoe Gewog, historical Kurtoed Province). The steep Rodang La further north provides non-motor communication, and several southerly passes including Thebong La are used by herders. At , a major peak stands over Thrumshing La.

To the east runs another lesser spur of mountains separating Lhuentse and Trashiyangse Valleys.

Tawang Range
To the east of the Manas River system, the Tawang Range (also called Kollong) forms the eastern boundary of Bhutan. The Tawang Range originates in Tibet, to the northeast of Arunachal Pradesh.

List of mountains

See also
Geography of Bhutan
Valleys of Bhutan

References

 
Bhutan